Juan Falcón Marcial (born 27 April 1965) is a Chilean-Cuban actor.

Falcón was born in La Habana. He supports the Cuban Revolution, but settled in Chile in 1990 to live with his wife, the daughter of Chilean exiles who had fled their country after the 1973 military coup.

He is best known for his roles in Iorana, Romané and El circo de las Montini. In theatre, his participation in Sinvergüenzas is remembered.

Filmography

Film 
 Campo minado, nadie vuelve intacto (1998, directed by Alex Bowen), as Weinceslao.
 Maria Luisa en la niebla (1999, directed by Leo Kocking).
 Historias de sexo (2000, directed by Antonia Olivares).
 B-Happy (2003, directed by Gonzalo Justiniano), as Nelson.
 Gente mala del norte (2006, directed by Patricia Riquelme).

Television series

Canal 13 
 El palo al gato (1992) as Agustin.
 Top Secret (1994) as Ignacio.
 El amor está de moda (1995) as Adriano.
 Adrenalina (1996) as Elias.
 Brujas (2005) as Jason Estevez.
 Descarado (2006) as Mauro Montoya.
 Papi Ricky (2007) as Antonio Noriega.
 Cuenta Conmigo (2009) as Pedro "Mono" Gonzalez
 Feroz (2010) as Tomas Hernandez
 Primera dama (2010) as Cameo

Mega 
 Rossabella (1997) as Jorge "Coke"
 Santiago City (1997) as Andrés.

TVN 
 Iorana (1998) as Siu Teao.
 La Fiera (1999) as Marcos Chamorro.
 Romané (2000) as Branco.
 Pampa Ilusión (2001) as Alberto Quispe.
 El circo de las Montini (2002) as Isidro Martin.
 Puertas adentro (2003) as Daniel Henriquez.
 16 (2003) as Roman Espoz.
 Los Pincheira (2004) as Delfin "Vinagre" Molina.
 Ídolos (2004) as Reinaldo Anderson.

Chilevision 
 La Doña (2011) as Cristobal Garcia de Leon
 La Sexóloga (2012) as Eloy Garay
 Graduados (2013) as Fernando
 Las 2 Carolinas (2014) as Wilson Vasquez

 Single TV series appearances 
 Cuento de mujeres (TVN, 2003) in the episode "Berta/Angela" as Cristian/Bruno.
 El cuento del tío (TVN, 2004) in the episode "Hombre Soltero Busca" as Jose Miguel.
 Los simuladores (Canal 13, 2005) in the episode "Asalto espress" as Ángel Ponce.
 Dinastía Sa-Sa (Canal 13, 2006) as Jason Estevez.
 Héroes (Canal 13, 2007).
 La divina comida'' (Chilevisión, 2017) as a guest.

References

Cuban male television actors
Living people
Cuban male film actors
21st-century Cuban male actors
Cuban male stage actors
1965 births
Naturalized citizens of Chile